Mathieu Gnanligo (born 13 December 1986 in Porto-Novo) is a Beninese sprinter who specializes in the 400 metres. His personal best time is 45.88 seconds, achieved in the heats of the 2008 African Championships in Addis Ababa.

He won a bronze medal at the 2007 All-African Games and finished seventh at the 2008 African Championships. He also competed at the 2007 World Championships and the 2008 and 2012 Olympic Games without reaching the final round.

Major competitions record

References

External links
 

1986 births
Living people
Beninese male sprinters
Athletes (track and field) at the 2008 Summer Olympics
Athletes (track and field) at the 2012 Summer Olympics
Olympic athletes of Benin
People from Porto-Novo
World Athletics Championships athletes for Benin
African Games bronze medalists for Benin
African Games medalists in athletics (track and field)
Athletes (track and field) at the 2007 All-Africa Games
Athletes (track and field) at the 2011 All-Africa Games